A gold bar, also called gold bullion or gold ingot, is a quantity of refined metallic gold of any shape that is made by a bar producer meeting standard conditions of manufacture, labeling, and record keeping. Larger gold bars that are produced by pouring the molten metal into molds are called ingots. Smaller bars may be manufactured by minting or stamping from appropriately rolled gold sheets. The standard gold bar held as gold reserves by central banks and traded among bullion dealers is the  Good Delivery gold bar. The premium on these bars when traded is very low over the spot value of the gold, making it ideal for small transfers between banks and traders. Most kilobars are flat, although some investors, particularly in Europe, prefer the brick shape.

Types

Based upon how they are manufactured, gold bars are categorized as having been cast or minted, with both differing in their appearance and price. Cast bars are created in a similar method to that of ingots, whereby molten gold is poured into a bar-shaped mold and left to solidify. This process often leads to malformed bars with uneven surfaces which, although imperfect, make each bar unique and easier to identify. Cast bars are also cheaper than minted bars, because they are quicker to produce and require less handling.

Minted bars are made from gold blanks that have been cut to a required dimension from a flat piece of gold. These are identified by having smooth and even surfaces.

Security features 
To prevent bars from being counterfeited or stolen, manufacturers have developed ways to verify genuine bars, with the most common way being to brand bars with registered serial numbers or providing a certificate of authenticity. In a recent trend, many refineries would stamp serial numbers even on the smallest bars, and the number on the bar should match the number on its accompanying certificate.

In contrast to cast bars (which are often handled directly), minted bars are generally sealed in protective packaging or Tamper Evident Packaging (TEP) to prevent tampering and keep them from becoming damaged. A hologram security feature known as a Kinegram can also be  embossed directly on a gold bar. Bars that contain these are called Kinebars.

Standard bar weight units

Gold is measured in troy ounces, often simply referred to as ounces when the reference to gold is evident. . The troy ounce is heavier than the avoirdupois ounce, a commonly used unit for measuring weight in the United States customary system. 
.

The standard gold bar held and traded internationally by central banks and bullion dealers is the Good Delivery bar with a  nominal weight. The minimum purity required is 99.5% gold. These bars must be stored in recognized and secure gold bullion vaults to maintain their quality status of Good Delivery. The recorded provenance of this bar assures integrity and maximum resale value.

 One tonne = 1,000 kilograms = 32,150.746 troy ounces.
 One kilogram = 1,000 grams = 32.15074656 troy ounces.
 One tola = 11.6638038 grams = 0.375 troy ounces.
 One tael = 50 grams.

Manufacturers

Largest gold bar

It was manufactured by the Mitsubishi Materials Corporation, a subsidiary of Mitsubishi. It went on display at the Toi Gold Museum on 11 July 2005. Its gold content was valued in 2005 at 400 million yen (approximately US$3,684,000 at the time). , it is worth approximately US$15.1M.

See also

 Bullion
 Doré bar
 Gold as an investment
 Gold coin
 Inflation hedge
 Ingot
 Millesimal fineness
 Official gold reserves
 Platinum
 Precious metal
 Silver
 United States Bullion Depository

Explanatory notes

References

External links 
 

Bar
Gold objects